Ben Twist (born 1 June 1990) is an Australian international lawn bowler.

Bowls career
He started bowling in 2003 and his first success was the Queensland state triples in 2007. He won the Australian Open triples in 2010 and made his international debut in 2018.

Twist became the Australian national champion after winning the 2019 Australian National Bowls Championships triples title.

In 2018, he won the Hong Kong International Bowls Classic singles title, having previously won the pairs with Jesse Noronha in 2017. In 2021, he won his second Australian Open crown, this time in the fours.

In 2022, he competed in the men's triples and the men's fours at the 2022 Commonwealth Games. Twist, along with Carl Healey and Barrie Lester won the silver medal.

References

Australian male bowls players
1990 births
Living people
Bowls players at the 2022 Commonwealth Games
Commonwealth Games medallists in lawn bowls
Commonwealth Games silver medallists for Australia
Medallists at the 2022 Commonwealth Games